Anolis gaigei, commonly known as Gaige's anole, is a species of lizard in the family Dactyloidae. The species is found in Colombia and Panama.

References

Anoles
Reptiles of Colombia
Reptiles of Panama
Reptiles described in 1916
Taxa named by Alexander Grant Ruthven